Kıbrıs Mobile Telekomünikasyon Ltd., doing business as Kuzey Kıbrıs Turkcell or KKTCELL' is one of the two major mobile carriers in Northern Cyprus. A subsidiary of Turkcell, it was launched as the second provider in the country after KKTC Telsim on 28 July 1999. By March 2009, Kuzey Kıbrıs Turkcell had reached 318 thousand subscribers.

Kuzey Kıbrıs Turkcell subscribers have started to be able to use 3G (3rd Generation) technology at November 2008.

First Advertisement

Old Logos

References

External links
 Kuzey Kıbrıs Turkcell official English web site
 Turkcell official English web site
 Kktcell's blog

Telecommunications companies of Northern Cyprus
Telecommunications companies established in 1999
1999 establishments in Northern Cyprus